Cresium or Kresion, also known as Ctesium or Ktesion, was an ancient port town on the island of Scyrus. Plutarch mentions the town as the location where Thessalian merchants were robbed of their merchandise, which robbery led, ultimately, to the intervention of Cimon in Scyrus.

Its site is located on Skyros.

References

Populated places in the ancient Aegean islands
Former populated places in Greece
Skyros